Srednja Vas is a small settlement above Begunje in the Municipality of Radovljica in the Upper Carniola region of Slovenia.

Geography
Srednja Vas lies on the southwest slope of Mount Dobrča. It is the highest-elevation settlement among the four villages (Slatna, Srednja Vas, Zadnja Vas, and Mlaka) collectively known as Pod gorami (literally, 'below the mountains') on the slope.

Name
The name Srednja vas literally means 'middle village'. Srednja vas and names like it (e.g., Srednje) indicate that the settlement lay in some sort of central or middle position between two larger settlements. The name is unrelated to names derived from sreda 'Wednesday' (e.g., Središče ob Dravi).

References

External links

Srednja Vas at Geopedia

Populated places in the Municipality of Radovljica